Diego Hernández may refer to:

People
 Diego Hernandez (politician) (born 1986/87), Oregon state representative
 Diego Hernández de Serpa (1510–1570), Spanish conquistador and explorer
 Diego E. Hernández (1934–2017), U.S. Navy officer
 Diego Antonio Hernández (born 1998), Mexican footballer
 Diego Hernández Basulto (born 1993), Mexican footballer
 Diego Suárez Hernández (born 1994), Spanish footballer
Diego Hernández (Uruguayan footballer) (born 2000)
 Diego Hernández (baseball), Dominican baseball player

Places
 Diego Hernández, Yauco, Puerto Rico, a barrio of Puerto Rico